The Hill–Hance House is a historic house in Chestnut Hill, Tennessee, United States.

History
The house was built circa 1800. It was acquired by Joseph Hill by 1827. By 1982, it belonged to his great-granddaughter, Ira Hill Hance.

Architectural significance
It has been listed on the National Register of Historic Places since August 26, 1982.

References

Houses in Jefferson County, Tennessee
Houses on the National Register of Historic Places in Tennessee
National Register of Historic Places in Jefferson County, Tennessee